Jan Hidde Kruize (born September 30, 1961 in The Hague, South Holland) is a former field hockey player from The Netherlands, who participated in two Summer Olympics: in Los Angeles (1984) and in Seoul (1988). He ended up in sixth place in California with the Dutch National Men's Team, and won the bronze medal in South Korea, after defeating Australia (2–1) in the Bronze Medal Game.

Just like his brothers Ties and Hans, and his father Roepie, Kruize played club hockey for HC Klein Zwitserland from The Hague. The striker earned a total number of 95 caps, scoring 31 goals, in the years 1982–1990. He was part of the Dutch team that won the 1983 EuroHockey Nations Championship and scored 4 goals.

References

External links
 
 Dutch Hockey Federation

1961 births
Living people
Dutch male field hockey players
Olympic field hockey players of the Netherlands
Field hockey players at the 1984 Summer Olympics
Field hockey players at the 1988 Summer Olympics
Olympic bronze medalists for the Netherlands
Field hockey players from The Hague
Olympic medalists in field hockey
Medalists at the 1988 Summer Olympics
HC Klein Zwitserland players